Great Britain, represented by the British Olympic Association (BOA), competed at the 1924 Summer Olympics in Paris, France. This was the first Summer Olympics in which athletes from the newly independent Irish Free State competed separately. Following the Royal and Parliamentary Titles Act 1927, the name changed (officially) to 'United Kingdom of Great Britain and Northern Ireland' but the Olympic team competed as Great Britain from the 1928 games onwards. 267 competitors, 239 men and 28 women, took part in 115 events in 18 sports.

Medallists

Athletics

Sixty-five athletes represented Great Britain in 1924. It was the nation's seventh appearance in the sport; Great Britain was one of three nations, along with Greece and the United States, to have competed in each edition of the Olympic athletics competitions. With three gold medals and eleven total medals, the British athletes finished third in both counts behind the Americans and the Finns. Harold Abrahams and Eric Liddell, two of the British Olympic champions in the sport, would later be the subjects of the film Chariots of Fire for their competition in Paris.

Liddell won the 400 metres, breaking the world record in the final. Abrahams took the gold medal in the 100 metres, matching the Olympic record in three of the four rounds. Lowe took the third championship for Great Britain, in the 800 metres. The 4 × 100 metre relay team, including Abrahams, briefly took the world record, though relinquished it to the American team which beat the British squad in the final.

Ranks given are within the heat.

Boxing 

Sixteen boxers represented Great Britain at the 1924 Games; Great Britain was one of four nations to have two wrestlers in each weight class (along with France, Italy, and the United States). It was the nation's third appearance in the sport. Great Britain matched the United States for most gold medals, at two, and most silver medals, also at two; those were all the medals won by the British team, however, while the United States also took a pair of bronzes to take the top medal spot with six to Great Britain's four. Mallin's middleweight championship came after a quarterfinal win by disqualification (Brousse bit Mallin) and a bout against countryman Elliott in the final. Mitchell took the light heavyweight crown without being bitten.

Cycling

Twelve cyclists represented Great Britain in 1924, the most of any nation. It was the nation's fifth appearance in the sport. The British cyclists took two medals—the silver and bronze in the 50 kilometres.

Road cycling

Ranks given are within the heat.

Track cycling

Ranks given are within the heat.

Diving

Eleven divers, five men and six women, represented Great Britain in 1924. It was the nation's fourth appearance in the sport. Clarke's bronze in the plain high diving competition resulted in Great Britain winning a single medal for the third consecutive Games.

Ranks given are within the heat.

 Men

 Women

Equestrian

Six equestrians represented Great Britain in 1924. It was the nation's second appearance in the sport, and first since 1912. Bowden-Smith matched the country's best result to date with a fourth-place finish in the jumping event.

Fencing

20 fencers, 16 men and 4 women, represented Great Britain in 1924. It was the nation's fifth appearance in the sport. Great Britain was one of nine nations to enter women in the first Olympic women's fencing competition; Davis took second in the event to give Great Britain its first individual fencing medal, and first fencing medal since the épée team took silver in 1912.

 Men

Ranks given are within the pool.

 Women

Ranks given are within the pool.

Gymnastics

Eight gymnasts represented Great Britain in 1924. It was the nation's sixth appearance in the sport, matching France for most appearances to that point.

Artistic

Modern pentathlon

Four pentathletes represented Great Britain in 1924. It was the nation's third appearance in the sport. Great Britain was one of six nations to have competed in each edition of the Olympic modern pentathlon to that time.

Polo

Great Britain sent a polo team to the Olympics for the fourth time in 1924. Great Britain was the only nation to send poloists to each Olympic polo tournament. The team beat both of the other European teams, France and Spain, but lost to each of the American teams, Argentina and the United States, in the round-robin tournament to finish with the bronze medal.

Ranks given are within the pool.

Rowing

21 rowers represented Great Britain in 1924. It was the nation's fifth appearance in the sport, tying Belgium and Canada for most appearances. For the first time, some of the British rowers competed without winning medals; prior to 1924, Great Britain won 15 medals with its 15 entries. In 1924, the rowers took only two gold medals in their five entries.

Ranks given are within the heat.

Sailing

Five sailors represented Great Britain in 1924. It was the nation's fourth appearance in the sport. The British team finished with a silver medal; it was the first time Great Britain competed in sailing but did not win any gold medals in the sport.

Shooting

Twenty-two sport shooters represented Great Britain in 1924. It was the nation's sixth appearance in the sport; Great Britain was one of three countries (along with Denmark and France) to have competed in each Olympic shooting contest. Mackworth-Praed took a pair of silver medals in the individual running deer competitions and led the British team to the gold medal in the double shots running deer event.

Swimming

Ranks given are within the heat.

 Men

* – Indicates athlete swam in the preliminaries but not in the final race.

 Women

Tennis

 Men

 Women

 Mixed

Water polo

Great Britain made its fifth Olympic water polo appearance (having missed only the 1904 tournament).  The team, which had won the gold medal in all four of its prior appearances, lost a one-goal game to Hungary in the first round, eliminating it from medal contention early.

Roster
Harold Annison
 John Budd
 Charles Bugbee
 Smith D. Edward
 R. Haston
 Richard Hodgson
 Arthur Hunt
 William Peacock
 Paul Radmilovic
 Charles Sydney

First round

Weightlifting

Wrestling

Freestyle wrestling

 Men's

Art Competitions

References

External links

Great Britain Athletics at the 1924 Paris Summer Games

Nations at the 1924 Summer Olympics
1924
Olympics
1924 in Northern Ireland sport